Eleanor Louise Ross (née Barnwell; born December 8, 1967) is a United States district judge of the United States District Court for the Northern District of Georgia and former Judge of the DeKalb County State Court.

Biography

Ross received her Bachelor of Arts degree in 1989, from American University. She received her Juris Doctor in 1994, from the University of Houston Law Center. She began her legal career as an Assistant District Attorney in Tarrant County, Texas, from 1995 to 1996. She served as an Assistant Solicitor General in the Office of the DeKalb County, Georgia, Solicitor General, from 1997 to 1998. From 1998 to 2002, she was a Senior Assistant District Attorney in the Fulton County District Attorney's Office. From 2002 to 2005, she was an Assistant United States Attorney in the Northern District of Georgia. From 2007 to 2011, she served as Executive Assistant District Attorney in the Fulton County District Attorney's Office. From 2011 to 2014, she served as a Judge on the DeKalb County State Court.

Federal judicial service

On December 19, 2013, President Barack Obama nominated Ross to serve as a United States District Judge of the United States District Court for the Northern District of Georgia, to the seat vacated by Judge Charles A. Pannell, Jr., who assumed senior status on January 31, 2013. She received a hearing before the full panel of the United States Senate Judiciary Committee on May 13, 2014. On June 19, 2014 her nomination was reported out of committee by a voice vote. On November 12, 2014 Senate Majority Leader Harry Reid filed for cloture on her nomination. On Monday, November 17, 2014 cloture was invoked by a 66–29 vote. On Tuesday, November 18, 2014 the Senate confirmed her by a voice vote. She received her judicial commission on November 20, 2014.

Notable rulings
In November 2018 Ross ruled against then Georgia Secretary of State Brian Kemp whose office delayed 50,000 voting registration applications placed on hold due to Georgia's “exact-match” law, requiring that personal information on voter applications match what is on state databases. Her ruling allowed some 3,000 naturalized U.S. citizens to vote in elections and prevent the state from throwing out some absentee ballots.

In August 2020, Ross ordered Georgia to extend the deadline for receiving absentee ballots by three days. That decision was later stayed by a split panel of the Eleventh Circuit.

She presided over the trial of Todd and Julie Chrisley, TV personalities from Chrisley Knows Best.

Personal life
She is married to Brian Ross, a DeKalb County Judge and former Clayton County prosecutor.

See also 
 List of African-American federal judges
 List of African-American jurists

References

External links

1967 births
Living people
African-American judges
African-American women lawyers
African-American lawyers
American women lawyers
American University alumni
Assistant United States Attorneys
Georgia (U.S. state) lawyers
Georgia (U.S. state) state court judges
Judges of the United States District Court for the Northern District of Georgia
People from Washington, D.C.
Texas lawyers
United States district court judges appointed by Barack Obama
21st-century American judges
University of Houston Law Center alumni
County district attorneys in Texas
21st-century American women judges